The 2015 Nepal blockade, which began on 23 September 2015 and lasted about six months, was an economic and humanitarian crisis which severely affected Nepal and its economy.

Nepal has accused India of imposing an undeclared blockade triggered by Indian concern about changes to the Nepali constitution, violent ethnic conflict, and Nepal's increasing cooperation with China. India has denied the allegations, stating the supply shortages have been imposed by Madheshi protesters within Nepal.

As a landlocked nation, Nepal imports all of its petroleum supplies from India. Roughly 300 fuel trucks enter from India on a normal day, but this had dwindled to a sporadic passage of 5–10 fuel trucks daily since the start of the crisis, though shipments of perishables like fruits and vegetables had generally been allowed to pass.

Moreover, India had also been stopping some Nepalese trucks at the Kolkata harbour. The blockade choked imports of not only petroleum, but also medicines and earthquake relief material. By March 2016, fuel shipments were mostly back to normal.

Background

Political intrigue 
Political intrigue is a recurring theme of Nepal. Since the Nepalese royal massacre of 2001, the country broke out into civil war that only ended in 2006, the victors being UCPN-M power brokers who forced Parliament and King Gyanendra to integrate them; the king later was forced to resign.   The two main leaders of UCPN-M are ex-Prime Minister Baburam Bhattarai and party head Prachanda.  Despite their once powerful posts and many disgruntled members having left the party with a few cadres after disputes and failures to get economic and political traction, the party never suffered from fallout as great as it has in 2015, when Baburam Bhattarai on 26 September severed ties with Prachanda and the UCPN-M amidst the Constitutional crisis and early days of the blockade, reducing the once formidable UCPN-M to an also-run political force despite its 80/600 parliamentary representation. Bhattarai stated "chances of me joining an old or a cracked house is out of option". The ruling Nepali Congress itself had been under intense pressure due to failure to act on quake relief and the blockade, this and the UCPN-M split paved the way for Khadga Prashad Oli of CPN-UML to become PM on 11 October.

Concerns about Nepal's constitution 
On 20 September 2015, the long-stalled Constitution of Nepal was passed with 90% approval from the representatives in Nepal's Constituent Assembly (CA). 66 members of Nepal's 598-strong Constituent Assembly, belonging to these groups, abstained from voting in protest. By 20 September, more than 40 people including 8 police officers had been killed in clashes between the protesters and the police. Not all constitution passage related protests, deaths, nor bandh (strike) were ordered by or took place among Madhesis or in the Madhesh; there are various unresolved issues touched off by the passage of the constitution related to the multitude of races, political interests and castes in the diverse and developing country. Nevertheless, the fuel crisis itself has direct relation to the Madhesh as it is the transit point for the vast majority of imports, two ethnic groups in the border region with India – Tharus and Madhesi people- have also been protesting against human rights violations, alleging that the new constitution marginalized them.  There were also bandhs (strikes) declared in the Terai region, even before the constitutional passage, curtailing Terai business but otherwise not affecting the rest of the country.

Parties representing Nepal’s Madhesi and Tharu ethnic communities organized protests against the constitution, leading to widespread violence in southern Nepal and a targeted campaign by Nepal security forces against protesting citizens based solely on their ethnicity. The Nepal government has accused India of unofficially backing this protest by slowing or stopping traffic from crossing the border into Nepal completely. However, India has maintained that Nepal’s failure to draft an inclusive Constitution is responsible for the unrest. It has also been pointed out by India that the “blockade” is taking place on Nepal’s side of the border, where protestors have attacked Indian drivers who were trying to transport food and facilitate trade between the two neighbors.

On 23 September 2015 demonstrators in Kathmandu shouted anti-India slogans to protest the fuel shortage. Nepal Cable Television Association blocked 42 Indian channels in protest against unofficial blockade into the country.

Indian concerns 
On the day that the fuel blockade began, Indian Express newspaper reported that India had demanded specific changes to the new Nepali constitution. While the Indian government denied this claim, the Indian Express reporter stood by his or her original report restating that "these amendments/changes were communicated by New Delhi to Kathmandu".

In a report from The Economic Times, a personnel from the Indian Sashastra Seema Bal (SSB) "confirmed that at least till the third week of September, they had orders from above to intercept fuel shipments to Nepal".

#BackOffIndia 

#BackoffIndia is a Twitter hashtag and social media campaign against alleged "intervention" by India in Nepal's internal affairs, accusing it of having caused the 2015 Nepal blockade of Nepal. The blockade was caused by Madhesi protestors in Nepal who were dissatisfied with the newly adopted Constitution of Nepal. However, the government of India and ruling party at that time held multiple meetings with Madhesi leaders and provoked them to cause blocking. India too participated passively with events like refusing to accept new constitution, orders were sent to border authorities at Indian side to not let any movements of goods across the border.

The hashtag was used by Nepalese around the world to accuse India of interfering in the country’s internal matters. During September–December 2015, more than 6,750 tweets have been created in Twitter with this hashtag. When news of the blockage of shipments reached the government, Kathmandu sent additional armed-police forces to the border. Many leaders of various parties claimed India had infiltrated the Madhesh with Indian protesters, and Madheshi leaders refuted the infiltration allegations, stating that the Madheshis should not be mistaken for Biharis or other Indians.

The hashtag was used again in 2019 when the Nepalese discovered that India included 35 sq. km. Kalapani territory at the northwest frontier of Nepal within India's territory. Kalapani had been included in Nepalese territory ever since the Sugauli Sandhi with British India Company and for almost a century prior to that. Once again, conspiracy theories give rise to disaffection.

Kalapani protest 
The Twitter hashtag again gained popularity when the Government of India’s Press Information Bureau released a map of India's territories in connection with the Jammu and Kashmir Reorganisation on 2 November 2019. The map showed Kalapani territory in Pithoragarh district of Uttarakhand state of India, which is disputed by Nepal, as a part of Darchula District of Sudurpashchim Province. Nepalese took to social media backing their government's claim to it using the hashtag.

Ties and border 
Due to an open border between Nepal and India, citizens of both countries can move freely, work, and live across borders without passports. Nepalese citizens moving along the border had long been an issue straining Nepal-India relations.  Madheshis share strong socio-cultural ties to the neighbouring Indian states of Bihar and Uttar Pradesh. India had expressed concerns over the violent protests, and had asked Nepal to take Madhesi interests into consideration. The government of Nepal and the Nepalese media portrayed Madhesi movements as subversively backed by Indian infiltrators, and as an assault on their sovereignty; furthermore, some Nepalis felt the crisis was ultimately an attempt to absorb Nepal into India in whole or in part, citing the case of Nepali-dominated Sikkim.

Connections to the 2015 Bihar elections 
Some critics have tied India's actions to political interest in the 2015 Bihar Legislative Assembly election. Justice Markandey Katju claimed that the blockade is "directly connected with the Bihar assembly elections". Likewise, General Ashok K. Mehta accuses the Indian Government of prioritizing an election victory in Bihar over Indian-Nepalese relations.

Geography and China 
Landlocked Nepal, due to its Himalayan location and extremely basic and fragile infrastructure depends on India for almost all its import needs. In 1989, India had closed 19 of the 21 border crossings, after a dispute over renegotiation of lapsed trade and transit treaties between the two countries.  Nepal's increasing cooperation with China, including its purchase of Chinese weaponry, was seen as a major factor behind this blockade. Nevertheless, India had warned against Nepal breaking the fuel stranglehold of India during the premiership of Girija Prasad Koirala.

"We are deeply concerned over the incidents of violence resulting in death and injury in regions of Nepal bordering India following the promulgation of Constitution yesterday. Our freight companies and transporters have also voiced complaints about the difficulties they are facing in movement within Nepal and their security concerns, due to the prevailing unrest.

We had repeatedly cautioned the political leadership of Nepal to take urgent steps to defuse the tension in these regions. This, if done in a timely manner, could have avoided these serious developments."

Immediately after the press release, all the border crossings in Nepal witnessed unusual stoppage of goods and transportation vehicles from India to Nepal, even though much of the border crossings, apart from the ones in Province 2 had not witnessed substantial border obstructions.

The blockade has caused the only international airport to deny foreign carriers fuel, contributing to isolating the landlocked nation from the outside world at a time when the country is still reeling from ongoing landslides blocking border trade with China following the devastating 2015 Nepal earthquake.  Meanwhile, none of the $4 billion of internationally donated quake relief funds to the Nepali government have been dispersed to survivors even after many months, causing anger among Nepalis and international agencies alike.

The Nepali government decided to stop providing fuel to private automobiles including public transport and taxis for few days at the beginning so as to distribute the fuel to government and prioritized sector. Some 2,000 factories are shut down as of 1 October. The Nepal Oil Corporation alleged and sued Indian Oil Corporation for not allowing the majority of trucks to enter Nepal.
The unofficial "Indian Blockade" forced Nepalese to ride bicycles and to carpooling, and many also turned to electric vehicles, with demand for electric motorcycles and scooters surging in response to the fuel shortage.

The Nepal oil corporation is the only state-owned company which imports and distributes petroleum in Nepal. It does not have enough facility to store petroleum for even over weeks use. So the public was angry for not getting petrol, diesel, cooking gas (LPG), kerosene from the state oil corporation although they stood in line for days. The government of Nepal had imposed a rule to provide fuel to the public as well as private transportation on the basis of odd and even number plate system. Although this system was imposed the taxi drivers and private vehicle owners faced huge problems to stand their vehicles in line for two-three days or more but still not getting required fuel. The oil black marketeers saw this as a big opportunity and started bringing fuel from the border points with India and selling it in Kathmandu and other places for threefold prices. For instance, before the Madhesi blockade, a price of a liter of petrol in Kathmandu was Rupees 104 whereas, after the blockade, the public was forced to buy petrol from the black marketeers paying Rupees 300 to 450 for a liter.

The government of Nepal failed to ease this fuel crisis and could not bring petroleum from China on time although it signed an agreement to buy one third of Nepal's petroleum requirement from the northern neighbor. This agreement was seen as a cornerstone for Nepal to end the full dependency on only one country for petroleum imports. The common Nepalese were hopeful to get fuel from the northern neighbor. The other Nepal-China border point, Tatopani in Sindhupalchowk district is not functional after the Nepal earthquake 2015 because of serious damages and obstructions. China had also donated 1.3 million liters of petrol to Nepal after the fuel crisis through the Kerung border point.

The Nepali government spoke of airlifting fuel and essential supplies when the talk with the Indian side was not fruitful. India was repeatedly saying to solve the issue with the Madheshi people because they are the ones who were blocking the border points and disrupting supplies. The Indian trucks cannot go to Nepal because of the insecurity as the Terai part of Nepal was facing strikes from the period before the Nepal's new constitution was declared. Some reports also came in Nepali media that the Madheshi protesters were sitting on the Indian land and throwing stones at Nepal. The government of Nepal was also unable to convey true message to the International communities about the problem in Nepal at a time when some Nepali scholars were asking the government to Internationalize the issue as India had moved back from the Nepal India friendship treaty and violated the various International trade, transit and commerce laws. While in Kathmandu, the government had asked for International help to solve the fuel crisis which was hitting the Nepalese life very hard. Nepal government started selling firewood in Kathmandu because there were acute shortage of cooking gas (liquified petroleum gas) that households were buying electrical induction cookers. As Nepal faces big energy problems and power cuts, using induction cookers would not be a permanent alternative to cooking gas.

The Government of India denied imposing a blockade, stating that the truck drivers coming from India were not entering Nepal due to safety concerns resulting from the violent protests. India's Ministry of External Affairs stated that the border obstructions were a result of "unrest, protests, and demonstrations on the Nepalese side, by sections of their population." The Government of Nepal contested India's claim, stating that there were no major security concerns that would prevent the trucks from entering Nepal. Nepal's spokesperson Laxmi Prasad Dhakal argued that the Madheshi protests had been happening since past few months, and Indian trucks had been entering Nepal until 23 September without any problems.

On 1 October, Indian minister Sushma Swaraj officially denied Nepal's accusations. India's spokesperson Vikas Swarup pointed out that India had sent 4,310 trucks to the border, where they had been stranded. He argued that from there onwards, it was Nepal's responsibility to ensure that the trucks entered Nepal safely. On the other hand, it is reported that the vehicles weren't allowed to enter Nepal by the Indian side thus resulting in long queues of Nepalese trucks stranded for days Inside the Indian border. The Indian Oil Corporation reportedly refused to fill the Nepalese trucks following instructions from higher authorities.

On 6 October, the Madheshi-centric Nepal Sadbhawana Party criticized the Nepali media reports blaming the blockade on India. Its President Rajendra Mahato stated that the blockade had been done by the Madheshi people and that India had nothing to do with it. The Indians alleged that the Maoists, who dominate the Nepali politics, were promoting a false propaganda against India. An editorial in the Nepali Times has claimed the Indian blockade is no longer about the Madhes and the constitution, but rather that India also seems to be opposed to KP Oli replacing Sushil Koirala as prime minister, and has a whole host of demands on security and other issues that we haven’t even heard about.

Nepal has lobbied the United Nations on the obstruction.

On 28 October, the Nepal Oil Corporation and PetroChina signed an agreement to import fuel from China, the first fuel agreement ever between the two nations. China also pledged to donate  of fuel to Nepal.
 Nepal is planning to import a third of its fuel from China.

Cascading shortages 
Nearly all sectors of the economy have taken a severe hit, from tourism to transport to domestic factories to agriculture.  The once vigorous construction industry had already come to a standstill before the blockade due to quake fears, new enforcement of building code, and monsoon issues, most reconstruction work has been put off until after the monsoon.  Tourism, a mainstay of hard currency, already saw 40% cancellation post-quake, since then new advisories from Germany to US have been issued due to Madhesi related issues., many restaurants remain closed in tourist zones and transport remains at best a hack.  Basic goods, mostly imported from India, remain in short supply.  Some 14 Nepali pharmaceutical factories remain shut, causing widespread shortages in medicine, including for infectious diseases like Tuberculosis which do not respect borders, some 90 percent of raw and packaging materials usually enter from Birgunj customs point (India). People have resorted to illegal imports of medicines from India, putting patients at risk.  The most acute shortages of medicines in Kathmandu are for Intensive Care Unit such as high blood pressure, diabetes, anesthesia, injectable antibiotics, and hyperbaric oxygen. In more remote areas zero supplies of medicines have come within 2 months, resulting in complete lack of medicines including vaccines and Oxygen. Rice paddy production was already forecast to shrink by 18-20 percent due to several factors.  The poor South Asian monsoon and chemical fertilizer shortage, improper seeds from post-quake international donations not suited to climate account for some 10% of the expected crop (half of the crop failure), however due to the fuel crisis the figure is expected to worsen sharply as machinery and fertilizer are affected, manpower is limited due to mass overseas migration of young males, disproportionately leaving elderly and children behind to tend to farms.  To provide heat, people have been increasing turning to electric heaters, causing increasing burden on electricity transmission and supply, with some 530 transformers having already exploded as of December.

Humanitarian crisis 

As issue of post-quake vulnerability became lost in the increasingly vocal information war between Kathmandu and New Delhi, a major humanitarian crisis has erupted at a time when international agencies are stretched very thin due to El Nino related agricultural disasters as well as exploding conflict in Syria, Yemen, and their spawned refugee crises.  UNICEF has followed with a warning echoing US embassy statements about the looming humanitarian disaster, citing 3 million children at risk of disease and death in Nepal alone. On a separate note, while governments focus on immediate needs and politics, misanthropes take advantage of the situation, in particular Human trafficking; some 400 girls who have entered India from Nepal have gone missing.

Overseas protests against blockade 

Nepalese residing in the UK demonstrated against the Indian Prime Minister Narendra Modi at 10 Downing Street, London during his visit on 12 November 2015. The demonstrators included ex-military families (the so-called "Gurkha Regiment" and "non-Gurkhas"), Sikh extremists and various other individuals dissatisfied with the Indian Prime Minister. Some reports claimed that as soon as Modi arrived back in Delhi, he ordered an assessment of the power which the Nepali people have in Great Britain and other places overseas On 17 November, the "Non-Resident Nepali Association USA" protested against what they refer to as the Indian Government's so-called "economic blockade of Nepal" in front of United Nations Headquarters in New York. Also on 30 November, another branch of the same "non-resident Nepali" group protested in front of India's embassy in Washington, D.C.

Police action against the protesters 
On 2 November, Nepalese police moved in to clear out the protesters in Birgunj. Despite police actions, the protesters managed to return and continue the blockade. Protesters attacked a Nepalese police station with petrol bombs and stones. In retaliation, the police opened fire, killing one person, Ashish Kumar Ram, who was later identified as an Indian citizen, which raised concerns over involvement of Indians in the Madhesh protests. Six Nepalese police officers were injured in the attack and more than 25 protesters and civilians were injured. Since then, a curfew has been imposed in Birgunj.

On 21 November, Nepalese police clashed with protesters led by Samyukta Loktantrik Madhesi Morcha (SLMM) in the district of Saptari who were blocking vehicles from entering Nepal. Around 5,000 protesters were involved. Nepalese police shot and killed three protesters at Bhardaha, Rupani and Rajbiraj. Another protester was killed on 22 November in Rajbiraj. Afterwards, a curfew was imposed on all three towns. To complicate matters, Tharuhat protestors of Tharu descent, also Madhesis, have clashed with the Madhesi parties seeking their own separate state different from Madhesi parties in the Western Terai zone.

Separately, Federal Limbuwan State Council (FLSC), representing different ethnic groups (Mongoloids) than the Madhesis (Indo-Aryans), represents the most ancient of the indigenous groups of Nepal, who have historically had a large degree of autonomy in the Far East Terai.  FLSC have been striking and enforcing vehicular bans on a separate region of the Terai for the entire time the Madhesis have been active doing the same; their demands overlap Madhesh demands and territories of states, both demands cannot be reconciled geographically.  Madhesi parties have refrained from direct confrontation with FLSC.   FLSC and the Mongoloid voice of the nation been almost completely ignored by all Western and Indian media; they don't have the backing of India nor Kathmandu.

 Nevertheless, India perceives FLSC as a pro-Nepal force.  FLSC has also accused Kathmandu of use of excessive brutal police forces just as the Madhesi parties have. KP Oli, Nepal's PM, issued a statement from Itahari (where FLSC is most active) in December 2015 that The government will not spare those who take the law in their hands..and air secessionist views, a veiled threat to FLSC actions.

Indian border police action 
On 25 November, Indian Sashastra Seema Bal (SSB) border police shot four Madhesi Nepali youths at the border. According to Nepali officials, the youths were trying to bring food and fertilizer into Nepal, and the shooting took place at Bhantabari, Sunsari District on the Nepalese side of the border. The SSB denied this, stating that the shooting took place in the Indian territory facing Nepal's Haripur village. The SSB also claimed that the people shot at were smuggling prohibited materials, and attacked its personnel when stopped. Nepalese government quickly responded with 1 million rupees in compensation to 4 victims' families dispensed within 2 days.

Attacks on Nepali media 
In spite of an apparent agreement hashed out between India and Nepal, Madhesis stated their demands were still not met.
Madhesi protesters have stepped up attacks against Nepali media outlets, with a Kathmandu Post media van torched on 28 December. India has also been stepping up its control of information in late December, with Sashastra Seema Bal wanting to install radio stations along the border. In Nepal there is the view that the Madhesi protestors are being used as a proxy for Indian actions.

Resolution 

India and Nepal seemed to have worked out their differences with passage of a constitutional amendment by Nepal, but Madhesi leaders remained defiant, along with other movements of separatists/autonomists. Nevertheless, Madhesis were the only movement with state support from India, but prominent Madhesi leader, Mahato, has backed down .

On 29 March 2016, panic buying caused by worries about another fuel blockade hit Kathmandu, where long lines of motorists formed. The prime minister had just returned from a visit to China with a number of agreements signed that will reduce long term dependence on India. Nepal Oil Corporation reported normal fuel shipments but, even one and a half months after the embargo was lifted, domestic diesel and cooking gas deliveries have not returned to normal.

Nepalese opinions 

Nepalese political analyst Amit Dhakal stated that "Even a child can make out that it is a deliberate blockade." Kishor Bikram Malla, a student leader of the CPN (UML) party opined that "The new generation of Nepalese can go without fuel for months but we are not ready to bend before India." Similarly, Nepalese political analyst Kanak Mani Dixit contended that Prime Minister of India authorized S. Jaishankar on his conduct towards Nepal: 

CPN (UML) has however denied any statement by the then PM KP Sharma Oli against India.

International reactions 

 – On 18 October, Tofail Ahmed, Minister of Commerce, Bangladesh, urged an end to the blockade and commented that such blockades hit at agreements like the BBIN.

 – On 24 October, Jean Lambert, MEP and Chair of the European Parliament Delegation to South Asia, stated the unofficial 'blockade' at the Nepali border only serves to hurt the Nepali people who are still recovering from the devastating earthquakes earlier this year. 

 – On 5 November 2015, the US expressed deep concern over the critical shortages of essential supplies in Nepal resulting from a volatile situation along the Nepal-India border.

 – On 11 November, Secretary-General Ban Ki-Moon reiterated his "concern over the obstruction of essential supplies on the Nepal-India border. Acute shortages in fuel supplies continue to impede planned deliveries to earthquake-affected villages in Nepal," said spokesman Stephane Dujarric. "The Secretary-General underlines Nepal's right of free transit, as a landlocked nation as well as for humanitarian reasons, and calls on all sides to lift the obstructions without further delay."

Aftermath 
In 2016, during Oli's visit to China, the two countries signed a treaty on trade and transit, including a plan to build a high speed railway from Kathmandu to the Chinese border. In June 2018, Nepal and China agreed on construction of the railway as a component of a series of cooperation projects approved by the two sides. A mutual agreement over the pre-feasibility study was reached in August 2018. The railway has been viewed as a way to reduce Nepal's dependence on India, which was made apparent during the 2015 Nepal blockade.

See also 
Anti-Indian sentiment

References

Bibliography

External links 

2015 in Nepal
Economy of Nepal
2015 in economics
Politics of Nepal
2015 in India
Blockades
India–Nepal relations
China–Nepal relations